Chris Morrissey (born c. 1980) is an American musician, currently living in Brooklyn, New York.  Morrissey plays the bass and has played and recorded with a number of bands:

 Mason Jennings
 Mark Guiliana Jazz Quartet
 Mark Guiliana (played on "Beat Music! Beat Music! Beat Music!" album)
 Jeremy Current
 Haley Bonar
 Bill Mike Band
 Tarlton
 Ben Kweller on his "The Trio on the Train Track Tour"
 Andrew Bird on his album Armchair Apocrypha
 Lucius on their album Wildewoman

References

External links
 Citypages.com (1)
 Citypages.com (2)
https://www.youtube.com/watch?v=faPR_qOKQTc

1980s births
Living people
Guitarists from Minnesota
Place of birth missing (living people)
American male bass guitarists
21st-century American bass guitarists
21st-century American male musicians
Sunnyside Records artists